Hallstead is a borough in Susquehanna County, Pennsylvania. The population was 1,179 at the 2020 census.

History
Hallstead was settled in 1787. What is now Hallstead was incorporated as Great Bend Village on November 28, 1874.  In 1887, it was renamed to Hallstead Borough in honor of William F. Hallstead,  president of the Delaware, Lackawanna and Western Railroad.

Geography

Hallstead is located at  (41.962425, -75.748598).

The boroughs of Hallstead and nearby Great Bend are bisected by both Interstate 81 and the Susquehanna River.

Demographics

As of the census of 2010, there were 1,303 people, 572 households, and 347 families residing in the borough. The racial makeup of the borough was 97.5% White, 0.7% African American, 0.4% Native American, and 1.4% from two or more races. Hispanic or Latino of any race were 1% of the population.

There were 572 households, out of which 28.8% had children under the age of 18 living with them, 41.6% were married couples living together, 13.1% had a female householder with no husband present, and 39.3% were non-families. 34.8% of all households were made up of individuals, and 19.2% had someone living alone who was 65 years of age or older. The average household size was 2.28 and the average family size was 2.90.

In the borough the population was spread out, with 22.7% under the age of 18, 58.4% from 18 to 64, and 18.9% who were 65 years of age or older. The median age was 44 years.

The median income for a household in the borough was $45,649, and the median income for a family was $46,313. Males had a median income of $39,531 versus $21,481 for females. The per capita income for the borough was $18,181. About 10.9% of families and 13.1% of the population were below the poverty line, including 17.1% of those under age 18 and 10.9% of those age 65 or over.

Education
Hallstead lies in Blue Ridge School District.
The Elementary School consists of Kindergarten to fifth grade with approximately 488 students in attendance.
The Middle School consists of grades 6-8 and has approximately 297 students.
The High School consists of grades 9-12 with approximately 429 students.

The School Board Consists of:  Alan Hall (President), Christina Cosmello (Vice President), Joel Whitehead (Treasurer), Loren Small (Secretary), Christina Whitney, Harold Empett, John Ketchur, Cindy Gaughan, Shane Rumage, Laurie Brown-Bonner, and Robert McTiernan (Superintendent).

The Foundry

During the early 1900s, it was a manufacturer of lead crystal but after almost three decades, ownership shifted and it became a major foundry.

Library System
The Hallstead-Great Bend Branch Library is located on 201 Franklin Street, Hallstead PA.
 November 1899—There was mention in a local paper that there were arrangements made for a "Citizen's Library"
 December 1915—A concrete lock-up building was constructed by Alfred E. Badgley for $1900 for the Hallstead Boro
 September 1916—The Hallstead Women's Christian Temperance Union opened a "Reading Room" to the public
 1917—Rented a room in the Lamb House at the corner of Susquehanna & Pine Streets, started with 40 books
 1918—Moved to William Richard house, outgrew the rooms
 November 1920—The Hallstead Public Library moved to present location (201 Franklin Street), sharing facilities with local jail.
 1929—The Civic Club formed a Book Club
 1931—The Civic Club began sponsoring the library.
 April 1936—The Civic Club took over running the library
 1976—Children's Room donated in memory of Alfred Hall
 1999—Joined with the Susquehanna County Library System and became the Hallstead-Great Bend Branch Library

References

External links

Boroughs in Susquehanna County, Pennsylvania
Populated places established in 1787
Pennsylvania populated places on the Susquehanna River
1787 establishments in Pennsylvania